RRJ Capital is a private equity firm based in Hong Kong and Singapore. It is one of the largest private equity firms based in Asia.

Background 
RRJ Capital, founded in March 2011 by Richard Ong who is currently Chairman and CEO. Ong was previously Co-head of Asia investment banking at Goldman Sachs.  The name "RRJ" is named after his three children.  

His brother, Charles Ong joined RRJ Capital in 2012 and is currently co-CEO and co-chairman. Previously, Charles was the chief strategist of Singaporean sovereign wealth fund Temasek Holdings.

The firm mainly invests in companies based in China and South-East Asia. Its investment industries include healthcare, financial institutions, technology, and logistics.

The firm has offices in Hong Kong and Singapore, with a team size of around 35 professionals.

Funds

Notable Transactions 

In 2013 and 2015, RRJ Capital invested in two Hong Kong-listed mainland real estate property stocks, Logan Property Holding and CIFI Holdings.

In 2014, RRJ Capital was the only non-Chinese direct investor in the acquisition of 30% of Chinese oil company, Sinopec.

In May 2014, RRJ Capital and Temasek Holdings invested $1.8 Billion in the NN Group before its initial public offering.

In November 2014, RRJ Capital and Temasek Holdings purchased $1 billion of convertible notes issued by Houston-based Cheniere Energy Inc.

In July 2018, RRJ Capita invested around $1.3 billion in companies owned by HNA Group. By then RRJ had a minority stake in insurance company FWD Group, which was reportedly laying the groundwork for an IPO in 2018.

In April 2019, RRJ Capital completed the acquisition of all outstanding shares in Gategroup from HNA Group. As a result, RRJ Capital became the sole shareholder and Temasek was invested in Gategroup through a mandatory exchangeable bond. In September 2019, Temasek converted the mandatory exchangeable bond to acquire 50% stake in Gategroup, making Temasek and RRJ co-shareholders.

In March 2021, RRJ Capital invested €450 million in Vodafone's Vantage Towers as part of its initial public offering.

References

External links
 www.rrjcap.com (Company Website)

Financial services companies established in 2011
Private equity firms of Asia-Pacific
Companies of Hong Kong
Companies of Singapore